Bến Tre is the capital city of Bến Tre Province, in the Mekong Delta region of southern Vietnam. Bến Tre is connected to the surrounding provinces by the Rạch Miễu Bridge.

History

The French occupied Bến Tre in 1867. The Viet Minh defeated the French at Dien Bien Phu and gained independence under the guidance of Ho Chi Minh and his generals. During the Tet Offensive in 1968, it was nearly destroyed by bombing.

Geography
Bến Tre is located on Bảo Island, with the districts of Châu Thành, Giồng Trôm and Ba Tri. The city is oriented in a triangular layout and is bordered by the following:

North and east by Châu Thành district.
South by Giồng Trôm district.
West by Hàm Luông River, separating the city from Mỏ Cày Bắc district.

Administration
The city of Bến Tre has 8 wards: 4, 5, 6, 7, 8, An Hội, Phú Khương and Phú Tân, and 6 communes: Bình Phú, Mỹ Thạnh An, Nhơn Thạnh, Phú Hưng, Phú Nhuận and Sơn Đông.

Schools
Bến Tre High School for the Gifted
Nguyen Dinh Chieu High School

Notable people

 Chân Không - Buddhist nun who worked closely with Zen master Thích Nhất Hạnh for more than fifty years
 Nguyễn Phương Khánh - Miss Earth 2018 winner

Gallery

References

External links

Ben Tre - The third Coconut Festival 2012
Bến Tre Hôm Nay
Official website of Ben Tre province (English ver.)
Michael D. Miller. Saving Ben Tre: American veteran's account of Bến Tre during the Tet Offensive

Populated places in Bến Tre province
Provincial capitals in Vietnam
Districts of Bến Tre province
Cities in Vietnam